Stephanitis pyrioides, the azalea lace bug, is a species of lace bug in the family Tingidae. It is found in Africa, Australia, Europe and Northern Asia (excluding China), North America, Oceania, South America, and Southern Asia.

References

Further reading

External links

 

Tingidae
Articles created by Qbugbot
Insects described in 1874